N7 may refer to:

Music and entertainment
 N7 (1995 TV film), with Cliff Parisi as Alvin
 The N7, a 2003 short film
 Never 7: The End of Infinity, a Japanese video game

Transport
 London Buses route N7
 SP&S Class N-7, a class of steam locomotives
 National Airlines (N7), an airline that operated from 1999 to 2002 under the IATA N7
 LNER Class N7, a class of British steam locomotives

Roads
 N7 road (Bangladesh)
 N7 road (Belgium), a road connecting Brussels and Doornik passing Halle and Ath
 N7 road (France)
 N7 road (Ireland)
 N7 road (Luxembourg) 
 N7 road (Netherlands), part of Rijksweg 7
 N7 road (Senegal)
 N7 road (South Africa), a road in South Africa connecting Cape Town to the Namibian border
 N7 road (Switzerland)
 Nebraska Highway 7, a state highway in the U.S. state of Nebraska

N07
 ATC code N07 Other nervous system drugs, a subgroup of the Anatomical Therapeutic Chemical Classification System
 Hereditary nephropathy ICD-10 code
 Lincoln Park Airport FAA LID
 N°7, a shortening for Number Seven
 N°7 is the seventh studio album by the Lebanese female singer Nancy Ajram

Other
 N7, a postcode district in the N postcode area of London, England.
 USS N-7 (SS-59), a 1917 N-class coastal defense submarine of the United States Navy
 N7 Day, an informal commemorative day observed annually on November 7 to celebrate the Mass Effect media franchise
 Nexus 7 (2012 version) or Nexus 7 (2013 version), Android tablets from Google
 ENSEEIHT, a French engineering school, nicknamed N7 after the phonetically equivalent French pronunciation of the acronym
N7, abbreviation for the 7 nanometer semiconductor technology process node